Menna Richards OBE was the Controller of BBC Cymru Wales from February 2000 to February 2011.

Biography
Born in Maesteg, Bridgend County Borough, Wales, Richards was educated at the town's Grammar School, and later at the University of Wales, Aberystwyth. Well-known for her contribution to broadcasting, her career began with BBC Wales as a broadcast journalist in 1976 and later as a reporter and producer for HTV Wales in the current affairs department in 1983, including the Welsh language current affairs series, Y Byd ar Bedwar. She rose to become managing director of HTV Wales in 1997, before the company was taken over by United News & Media.

Richards rejoined BBC Wales as a Controller in February 2000 and retired in February 2011. It was revealed as part of the BBC's open policy in November 2009, that Richards salary per annum to August 2009 was £185,000, with total remuneration of £192,800. She was responsible for bringing series such as Doctor Who, Torchwood, Merlin, The Sarah Jane Adventures, Sherlock and Upstairs Downstairs to global TV screens.

She was married to the TV presenter Patrick Hannan, who died in 2009, aged 68, following a short illness.

Honours
Richards was appointed Officer of the Order of the British Empire (OBE) in the New Year Honours 2010 for her services to broadcasting.

In the same year she was also appointed to the board of the Welsh National Opera. In addition, she was awarded a BAFTA in 2015 for Outstanding Contribution to Television.

References

External links
Menna Richards at BBC Info

Year of birth missing (living people)
Living people
Welsh-language television presenters
Welsh-speaking journalists
BBC executives
Welsh journalists
Welsh women journalists
Welsh television presenters
Welsh women television presenters
Officers of the Order of the British Empire